The Freikorps Lichtschlag was a paramilitary unit in Germany that was established on 14 December 1918 just after the end of  World War I. 

After the German Revolution of 1918–1919, the corps command of the VII. Armeekorps based in Münster under General Oskar von Watter began to establish Freikorps units out of troops returning from the Western Front. Thus the Freikorps Lichtschlag was created in the area around Hagen. It was under the command of Captain Otto Lichtschlag (1885–1961) and had a strength of about 2500 men.

In early 1919 the unit was deployed against the so-called Red Ruhr Army in the Ruhr area, on the orders of Oskar von Watter. On 15 February the force acted against striking workers in the town of Dorsten with severity. Subsequently the supporters of the Communist Party (KPD) and the Independent Social Democratic Party (USPD) declared a general strike in the Ruhr area. This was suppressed, however. Subsequently, the situation remained tense and was further heated up through the actions of the Freikorps. On 15 April 1919, soldiers of the Freikorps Lichtschlag shot into a gathering of striking workers in the district of Mettmann, resulting in some deaths and injuries. 

During the Kapp Putsch, the unit did not support the Weimar Republic, but was a supporter of the putschists. The unit was against the workers who refused to call off their general strike after the end of the Putsch. In March 1920 the unit marched into Wetter, in order to enter the Ruhr area from the east. On 16 March its advance was stopped near Aplerbeck by 10,000 men of the Red Ruhr Army, ad one day later the Freikorps was defeated. 

20th-century Freikorps
Organizations of the German Revolution of 1918–1919
Anti-communist organizations